The National Mandate Party, frequently abbreviated to PAN, is an Islam-based political party in Indonesia.

It was founded by the modernist strand of Muslim society in Indonesia, including Amien Rais, the chairman of the Muhammadiyah organization, during the Indonesian revolution. The party contested the 2009 elections under the chairmanship of Sutrisno Bachir. It is described as a nationalist Muslim party. It also upholds the Pancasila doctrine.

In 2014, the party obtained 7.59 percent of the popular vote, which is an increase from 6.03 percent in 2009 and 6.44 percent in 2004. PAN is currently the ruling party in Southeast Sulawesi.

Background

On 14 May 1998, around 50 political figures, including Goenawan Mohammad, Faisal Basri and Amien Rais established an organization called the Peoples Mandate Council open to anybody who wanted to listen and express opinions. At the time, Amien Rais said that MARA would assess the performance of president Suharto's cabinet over the next six months. He also said that the people needed a strong forum that was respected by those in power and that the power structure under Suharto was not good at listening to people's opinions because it had become arrogant. At the time of the downfall of the Suharto regime in 1998, many new parties were being established and some of them wanted Amien Rais and other members of MARA to join them. One of these was the Crescent Star Party whose eventual leader Yusril Ihza Mahendra tried to persuade Amien Rais to establish a party. When he refused the offer, the party went its own way. On July 27, 1998 (the day after the declaration of the creation of the Crescent Star Party), Amien Rais announced the establishment of a new party to be called the People's Mandate Party. This was changed to the current name after a lengthy voting process. The new party had its roots in the principles of religious morality, humanity and prosperity.

2020 Party fracas
On 11 February 2020, a PAN national congress, held in Kendari, Southeast Sulawesi, was marred by violence when party members started throwing chairs at one other amid a dispute over candidates to lead the party. One PAN member suffered a broken leg during the melee. Reports said thugs had been deployed at the congress to support Mulfachri Harahap's candidacy for the party leadership. PAN leader Zulkifli was re-elected at the congress, receiving 331 votes, while Mulfachri received 225 votes.

PAN in the legislature

Indonesian legislative election, 1999
In the 1999 elections, PAN won 7.4 percent of the vote and 34 seats in the legislature. The party then played a key role in putting together a central axis of Islamic political parties in the People's Consultative Assembly which helped ensure that Abdurrahman Wahid defeated Megawati Sukarnoputri when that chamber elected the president.

However, PAN's support for Abdurrahman Wahid did not last long. Less than a year after officially confirming its support for him at its first congress in Yogyakarta in February 2000, the party withdrew this support, saying it was concerned about the condition of the nation and state of Indonesia. Not long after that, Abdurrahman Wahid was voted out of office and replaced by Megawati Sukarnoputri.

Indonesian legislative election, 2004
For the 2004 elections, the party set a target of 15 percent of the vote. In order to promote his presidential candidacy, Amien Rais made a series of visits around the country. He also said that he was convinced that a retired military officer should be his vice-president. However, in the legislative election, the party won 6.4% of the popular vote and 52 out of 550 legislative seats. For the presidential election, Amien Rais stood with Siswono Yudo Husodo as his running mate, but only won 15% of the vote.

Indonesian legislative election, 2009

The party came fifth in the 2009 legislative election with 6% of the vote, gaining 43 seats in the People's Representative Council.

Indonesian legislative election, 2014 
Despite its declining influence and popularity, the party aimed to garner at least 10 percent of the vote in 2014. However in the legislative election, PAN only won 7.49 percent of the vote. A few weeks after the legislative election, PAN announced party leader Hatta Rajasa as vice presidential candidate to run alongside Prabowo Subianto.

Party platform
PAN is open to all elements of society, regardless of gender, ethnicity or religion. According to the party website, PAN strives for the sovereignty of the people, social justice, and a better life for the people to bring about an Indonesian nation that is prosperous, developed, independent and dignified. It also wants to realize good and clean governance that protects all the people and brings prosperity, and to see a united, sovereign nation. The party wants to play a part in implementing world order based on independence, eternal peace and social justice, and wants Indonesia to be respected in the international community.

Election results

Legislative election results

Presidential election results

Note: Bold text suggests the party's member

Bibliography
 Daniel Dhakidae (Ed), (2004) Partai-Partai Politik Indonesia: Ideologi dan Program 2004-2009 (Indonesian Political Parties: Ideologies and Programs 2004-2009) Kompas (1999)  Indonesian
 Evans, Kevin Raymond, (2003) The History of Political Parties & General Elections in Indonesia, Arise Consultancies, Jakarta, 
 Musa Kazhim & Alfian Hamzah (1999) 5 Partai Dalam timbangan (5 Parties in Consideration), Putaka Hidaya, Bandung  Indonesian

References

1998 establishments in Indonesia
Islamic democratic political parties
Islamic political parties in Indonesia
Pancasila political parties
Political parties established in 1998
Political parties in Indonesia